Anna Atkins (16 March 1799 – 9 June 1871) was an English botanist and photographer. She is often considered the first person to publish a book illustrated with photographic images. Some sources say that she was the first woman to create a photograph.

Early life
Atkins was born in Tonbridge, Kent, England in 1799. Her mother, Hester Anne Children, "didn't recover from the effects of childbirth" and died in 1800. Anna was close to her father John George Children, a renowned chemist, mineralogist, and zoologist. Anna "received an unusually scientific education for a woman of her time." Her detailed engravings of shells were used to illustrate her father's translation of Lamarck's Genera of Shells.

In 1825, she married John Pelly Atkins, a London West India merchant, later sheriff, and proponent of railways; during this same year, she moved to Halstead Place, the Atkins family home in Halstead, near Sevenoaks, Kent. They had no children. Atkins pursued her interests in botany by collecting dried plants, which were probably used as photograms later. She was elected a member of the London Botanical Society in 1839.

Photography 
John George Children and John Pelly Atkins were friends of William Henry Fox Talbot. Anna Atkins learned directly from Talbot about two of his inventions related to photography: the "photogenic drawing" technique (in which an object is placed on light-sensitized paper and exposed to the sun to produce an image) and calotypes.

Atkins was known to have had access to a camera by 1841. Some sources say that Atkins was the first female photographer, while others attribute this title to Constance Fox Talbot. As no camera-based photographs by Anna Atkins, nor photographs by Constance Talbot, survive, the issue may never be resolved.

Photographs of British Algae: Cyanotype Impressions
Sir John Herschel, a friend of Atkins and Children, invented the cyanotype photographic process in 1842. Within a year, Atkins applied the process to algae (specifically, seaweed) by making cyanotype photograms that were contact printed "by placing the unmounted dried-algae original directly on the cyanotype paper".

Atkins self-published her photograms in the first installment of Photographs of British Algae: Cyanotype Impressions in October 1843. She planned to provide illustrations to William Henry Harvey's A Manual of British Algae which had been published in 1841. Although privately published, with a limited number of copies, and with handwritten text, Photographs of British Algae: Cyanotype Impressions is considered the first book illustrated with photographic images.

Eight months later, in June 1844, the first fascicle of William Henry Fox Talbot's The Pencil of Nature was released; that book was the "first photographically illustrated book to be commercially published" or "the first commercially published book illustrated with photographs".

Atkins produced a total of three volumes of Photographs of British Algae: Cyanotype Impressions between 1843 and 1853. Only 17 copies of the book are known to exist, in various states of completeness. Copies are now held by the following institutions, among others:
 British Library, London, which provides scans of 429 pages of its copy (which has extra plates) online. She presented these volumes to the British Museum via J. E. Gray between 1843 and 1853.
 Kelvingrove Art Gallery and Museum, Glasgow, Scotland.
 Metropolitan Museum of Art, New York.
 New York Public Library, which provides scans of 285 pages of its copy online.
 The Royal Society, London, whose copy with 403 pages and 389 plates is thought to be the only existing copy of the book as Atkins intended.
 The Victoria and Albert Museum, London, holds a number of original works in their library.
 The Linnean Society of London, whose copy lacks part 7 of volume 1.
 The Horniman Museum and Gardens holds a particularly complete copy with 14 pages of text and 443 plates. She provided plates with additional images of the same species when she found a better example, and these duplicates have been retained in this copy.
 Rijksmuseum, Amsterdam.
 Université de Montréal, Montreal

One copy of the book with 411 plates in three volumes sold for £133,500 at auction in 1996. Another copy with 382 prints in two volumes which was owned by scientist Robert Hunt (1807–1887) sold for £229,250 at auction in 2004.

In 2018, the New York Public Library opened an exhibition on Atkins' life and work, featuring various versions of Photographs of British Algae.

Later life and work
In addition to Photographs of British Algae, Atkins published five fictional novels between 1852 and 1863. These included The Perils of Fashion, Murder will Out: a story of real life, and A Page from the Peerage.

In the 1850s, Atkins collaborated with Anne Dixon (1799–1864), who was "like a sister" to her, to produce at least three presentation albums of cyanotype photograms:

 Cyanotypes of British and Foreign Ferns (1853), now in the J. Paul Getty Museum;
 Cyanotypes of British and Foreign Flowering Plants and Ferns (1854), disassembled pages of which are held by various museums and collectors;
 An album inscribed to "Captain Henry Dixon," Anne Dixon's nephew (1861).

Atkins retained the algae, ferns and other plants that she used in her work and in 1865 donated the collection to the British Museum.

She died at Halstead Place in 1871 of "paralysis, rheumatism, and exhaustion" at the age of 72.

In popular culture
On 16 March 2015, Internet search engine Google commemorated Atkins's 216th birthday by placing a Google Doodle image of bluish leaf shapes on a darker background on its search page to represent her cyanoprint work.

Atkins' work was a major feature in the New Realities Photography in the Nineteenth Century exhibition held in the Rijksmuseum, Amsterdam, June – September 2017.

Publications

See also
Timeline of women in science

References

Further reading
 
 Gerhard Bissell, Atkins, Anna, in: Allgemeines Künstlerlexikon (Artists of the World), Suppl. I, Saur, Munich 2005, from p. 514 (in German).

External links

Scans of Photographs of British algae: cyanotype impressions at New York Public Library (public domain). Retrieved 6 January 2016.
Anna Atkins Collection Items  at Victoria and Albert Museum

1799 births
1871 deaths
19th-century British botanists
19th-century English photographers
19th-century British women artists
19th-century British women scientists
English women photographers
People from Tonbridge
Pioneers of photography
Women botanists
Photographers from Kent
19th-century women photographers
People from Sevenoaks District